Keith Harding (born 1938) is a Scottish politician. He was a Conservative and Unionist Member of the Scottish Parliament (MSP) for Mid Scotland and Fife from 1999 to 2003.

He was leader of Stirling Council from 1991 to 1995. After being elected to Holyrood he was the Conservative spokesman on local government and housing.

Prior to the 2003 election he was moved from first to fifth place on the Conservative's list for Mid Scotland and Fife. After parliament was dissolved he defected to the newly formed Scottish People's Alliance. He subsequently fought Stirling for the SPA but came in a poor sixth place with only 642 votes (2.2%).

He was a member of the national policy committee of the New Party, the successor to the SPA.

References

External links 
 

1938 births
Living people
Conservative MSPs
Members of the Scottish Parliament 1999–2003
Scottish Conservative Party councillors
Councillors in Fife